Hope is For People is a 7-inch EP by Ohio based Pop Punk band Mixtapes (band). It is their second release on Animal Style Records.

Track listing

Personnel
Ryan Rockwell – vocals, guitar
Maura Weaver – vocals, guitar
Michael Remley – bass
Boone Haley – drums

References

2011 albums